Heritage Hotel may refer to:

 Heritage Hotel, Bulli, New South Wales
 Heritage Hotel, Rockhampton, Queensland